Jeff B. Cohen (born November 10, 1951) is an American journalist, media critic, professor, and the founder of Fairness and Accuracy in Reporting (FAIR), a media watchdog group in the US. He is a retired associate professor of journalism at Ithaca College, where he was an endowed chair and founding Director of the Park Center for Independent Media. He was formerly a lawyer for the ACLU and authored or coauthored five books that criticize media bias, mainly written with 2012 California Congressional District 2 candidate, Norman Solomon, who missed the "top two" runoff by only 174 votes. Between 1997 and 2002, Cohen was a regular commentator for Fox News Channel's Fox News Watch, for MSNBC and CNN. He appeared in Outfoxed, a documentary critical of Fox News, and other documentaries.

Biography 
Cohen grew up in Detroit and did undergraduate study at the University of Michigan. He studied law at the People's College of Law in Los Angeles and was admitted to the California Bar in 1981. Cohen then worked as a journalist in the L.A. area and after law school was a lawyer for the ACLU. Cohen founded FAIR in 1986 and subsequently served as executive director and on the board of directors.

In 2002 Cohen left FAIR to work full-time for MSNBC as senior producer of Phil Donahue's show, Donahue. Previously, he briefly co-hosted CNN's Crossfire in 1996 and was a regular panelist on FNC's Fox News Watch from 1997 to 2002. Cohen had also been a return commentator at multiple networks.

Cohen was communications director for the Kucinich presidential campaign in 2003.

In 2006, Cohen became a volunteer journalist for OpEdNews and has since contributed over 50 articles.

In 2008, Cohen became the founding director of the Park Center for Independent Media at the Roy H. Park School of Communications at Ithaca College where he is an associate professor in the journalism department. The center studies, educates about, and advocates for non-corporate-controlled, independent news journalists and media outlets. Cohen additionally lectures across the country.

Beginning in the 1990s, Cohen, with Norman Solomon, wrote the "Media Beat" column syndicated in newspapers across the US, wrote occasional commentaries in various newspapers, and wrote a column for Brill's Content. He also has written investigative pieces for Rolling Stone, New Times, The Nation, Mother Jones, and other publications.

Books 
 Cable News Confidential: My Misadventures in Corporate Media (2006)  
 Wizards of Media Oz: Behind the Curtain of Mainstream News (1997) (with Norman Solomon)
 Through the Media Looking Glass: Decoding Bias and Blather in the News (1995) (with Norman Solomon) 
 The Way Things Aren't: Rush Limbaugh's Reign of Error (1995) (with Steve Rendall and Jim Naureckas)  
 Adventures in Medialand: Behind the News, Beyond the Pundits (1993) (with Norman Solomon)

Documentary 
 All Governments Lie: Truth, Deception and the Spirit of I. F. Stone (2016) Co-producer

See also
 Bob McChesney (Media Matters)

References

External links 
 Personal homepage
 Jeff Cohen at FAIR.org
 Jeff Cohen bio at Huffingtonpost
 Park Center for Independent Media homepage
 Faculty page at Ithaca College
 Scott Ritter and Jeff Cohen addressed an audience of 250 in Sacramento, CA on 1/16/08, MP3
 Video: Jeff Cohen and Scott Ritter – U.S. Tour of Duty: The Iran Talks (January 14, 2008)
 19 August 2015, 12 October 2014, 1 May 2011, 11 January 2009, 9 May 2004 interviews on
 
 

Living people
People from Detroit
American media critics
American political writers
American male non-fiction writers
University of Michigan alumni
Ithaca College faculty
People's College of Law alumni
1951 births